Freddy in the Wild West is a 1964 West German/Italian musical Western film directed by Sobey Martin and starring Freddy Quinn, Rik Battaglia, and Beba Lončar. Playing a small role of Olivia is Mamie Van Doren, a 1950s Hollywood sex goddess. It was co-produced with and shot on location in SFR Yugoslavia. It was one of a crop of western-set German films made in the 1960s, many of them based on works of Karl May. It is also known by the alternative title of The Sheriff Was a Lady.

Cast
 Freddy Quinn as Black Bill / John Burns / Freddy
 Rik Battaglia as Steve Perkins
 Beba Lončar as Deputy Sheriff Anita Daniels
 Carlo Croccolo as Sheriff Mickey Stanton
 Trude Herr as Joana Stanton
 Josef Albrecht as Uncle Ted Daniels
 Otto Waldis as Old Joe
 Ulrich Hüls as Buck
 Klaus Dahlen as Harry
 Mariona as Saloon Singer
 Bruno W. Pantel as Barman
 Stojan 'Stole' Arandjelovic as Perkins Henchman
 Vladimir Medar as Murdock, Perkins Henchman
 Milivoje Popovic-Mavid as Perkins Henchman
 Janez Vrhovec
 Desa Beric
 Mirko Boman as Perkins Henchman
 Mamie Van Doren as Olivia

References

Bibliography

External links 
 

1964 films
1960s Western (genre) musical films
1960s historical musical films
Constantin Film films
Films directed by Sobey Martin
German Western (genre) musical films
German historical musical films
1960s German-language films
Italian Western (genre) musical films
Italian historical musical films
1960s Italian-language films
West German films
Yugoslav Western (genre) musical films
Yugoslav historical musical films
1960s multilingual films
German multilingual films
Italian multilingual films
Yugoslav multilingual films
1960s Italian films
1960s German films